The 2016 FIA World Rallycross Championship presented by Monster Energy was the third season of the FIA World Rallycross Championship. The season consists of twelve rounds and started on 16 April with the Portuguese round at Montalegre. The season ended on 27 November, at Rosario, Santa Fe in Argentina.

Petter Solberg was the defending drivers' champion. Team Hansen-Peugeot were the defending teams' champions. After 11 rounds, Mattias Ekström clinched the Drivers Championship. His team EKS secured the teams championship at the final round in Argentina.

Calendar

On 30 October 2015 the 2016 calendar was announced, removing the rounds in Italy and Turkey and adding an event in Latvia. On 2 December 2015 the FIA World Motor Sport Council approved in Paris the 2016 FIA World Rallycross Championship calendar and confirmed the separation of European and World Rallycross heats during events. The RX Lites category was held in support of the World Championship, which consisted of seven events and a non-championship round in Canada.

¹ = A one-car team is ineligible to score teams' championship points.

² = Non-championship round.

Teams and drivers

Supercar

* Entries in grey denote one-car teams which are ineligible to score teams championship points.

1 = JRM has announced the termination of Liam Doran's contract with the team following the sixth round (Sweden) of the championship.

2 = Nitišs left the Münnich Motorsport team following event eight (France) and returned to Olsbergs MSE for event nine (Barcelona).

RX Lites
All teams used identical Olsbergs MSE-produced Ford Fiestas

NC represents participation in the non-championship round in Canada.

Championship Standings

FIA World Rallycross Championship for Drivers

FIA World Rallycross Championship for Teams

RX Lites Cup

References

External links

 
World Rallycross Championship seasons
World Rallycross Championship